Chateaugay (February 29, 1960 – May 9, 1985) was an American Thoroughbred Champion racehorse who won two of the three U.S. Triple Crown races. Bred at Darby Dan Farm near Lexington, Kentucky by his prominent owner, John W. Galbreath, Chateaugay was a son of Swaps, the 1956 U.S. Horse of the Year and a Racing Hall of Fame inductee.

Racing career

1962: two-year-old season
Racing at age two for future U.S. Hall of Fame trainer James P. Conway, Chateaugay showed limited promise, winning two of five starts but without a victory in a stakes race.

1963: three-year-old season

Prep races
At age three, the colt began to develop and after winning the Blue Grass Stakes at Keeneland Race Course was sent to compete in America's most prestigious race, the Kentucky Derby.

Triple Crown races
The 1963 edition of the Kentucky Derby, the first leg of the Triple Crown series, saw 120,000 patrons gather at Churchill Downs for a race that featured three Thoroughbred stars. Time magazine reported jockey Eddie Arcaro as saying: "I can't remember a Derby creating so much excitement."

Leading up to the race, Rex C. Ellsworth's undefeated Candy Spots had won the Florida Derby and the Santa Anita Derby. At the same time, a Greentree Stable colt named No Robbery had won the Wood Memorial Stakes, and he too came into the Derby undefeated. Then there was Harry F. Guggenheim's 1962 U.S. 2-Year-Old Champion Colt and 1963 Flamingo Stakes winner, Never Bend. By post time, bettors had made Candy Spots the 3-2 favorite, No Robbery the second choice at 5-2, and Never Bend the third pick at odds of 3-1. Even though he came into the race undefeated at three (3-3) including a win in April's Blue Grass Stakes, Chateaugay was nearly ignored amid the hype surrounding the three star horses and was sent off at 9-1 odds.

When the gate opened, Never Bend quickly took the lead and by the  mile mark No Robbery had moved into second place along the inside rail with Candy Spots sitting third. After running in sixth place through the first three-quarters of a mile, coming out of the backstretch Chateaugay moved to the far outside and raced into fourth place behind the three leaders. As they turned for home, jockey Braulio Baeza spotted an opening between the second- and third-place horses. He raced through it to pull alongside Never Bend and then moved ahead to win the race by  lengths.

In the Preakness Stakes at Pimlico Race Course in Baltimore, Maryland, Chateaugay again faced both Candy Spots and Never Bend. Five days before the race, he got away from his exercise rider and equaled Pimlico's track record, working a mile in 1:37 3/5.  Bettors made Candy Spots the favorite. As they had in the Derby, Never Bend charged out to an early lead with Candy Spots sitting in third. Once again, Chateaugay was far back, running seventh in the eight-horse field. As they turned onto the homestretch Chateaugay made his move and soon caught and passed Never Bend, who had fallen behind the now front-running Candy Spots. This time, Chateaugay could not catch the leader and finished second,  lengths back.

As a result of major renovations in progress at New York's Belmont Park, the 1963 Belmont Stakes was run at Aqueduct Racetrack. As he had been in the Derby and Preakness, Candy Spots was the betting favorite. Sent off at 9-2 odds, Chateaugay repeated his running style from the previous two Classics and was well back of the leaders. Once again, while other horses began to tire during the  mile race, in the stretch, Chateaugay passed Candy Spots and pulled away to win by a widening  lengths.

Later races
Chateaugay went on to capture the 1963 Jerome Handicap but finished third in the Dwyer and Travers Stakes.

Later career
He was raced at age four and five with limited success before being retired to stud duty at Darby Dan Farm. His progeny met with modest racing success with perhaps his best being the colt True Knight, who won several stakes races including the Jerome and Suburban Handicaps.

Stud record
In 1971, Chateaugay became the first Kentucky Derby winner to be sold to Japanese interests. From 1972 until his death in 1985, he stood at a breeding farm in Japan, where he sired the 1981 Champion juvenile colt, Hokuto Flag.

Pedigree

In popular culture
In Ken Grimwood's novel Replay, the main character is stuck in a time loop and makes his first bet (of which he already knows the outcome), on Chateaugay in the 1963 Kentucky Derby.
In the TV show Mad Men, Season 3 Episode 9, Roger Sterling throws a Kentucky Derby party for the 1963 edition of the race.

References

 Chateaugay's pedigree and partial racing stats
 The 1963 Kentucky Derby at the Churchill Downs official website with race video
 "Sweet Revenge". Time. May 24, 1963. About the Preakness Stakes.
 Chateaugay's offspring at the Triple Crown database by Kathleen Irwin and Joy Reeves

1960 racehorse births
1985 racehorse deaths
Racehorses bred in Kentucky
Racehorses trained in the United States
Kentucky Derby winners
Belmont Stakes winners
American Champion racehorses
Thoroughbred family 16-h